X-Rite, Inc. is a manufacturer of color measurement and management products, located in Grand Rapids, Michigan, United States.

The company also creates products that regulate quality in the processing of film and x-rays.

History 
The firm was incorporated in 1958 by seven engineers from Lear Siegler. Its first product, x-ray marking tape, was introduced in 1968 and is the basis of the company name.  In 1975, it introduced its first densitometer for photographic printing use.

The firm went public in 1986, and in 1987 moved into a new headquarters and production facility in Grandville, Michigan.

By 1990, the firm shifted emphasis to the field of color measurement. In 1966 it purchased H. Miller Graphic Arts of England; in 2006 it purchased Amazys, owners of Gretag–Macbeth and thereby the Munsell products; in 2007 it acquired Pantone, Inc.

In 2012 the firm was acquired by Danaher Corporation.

Subsidiaries 
 Munsell Color
 Pantone, Inc.
 X-Rite AG
 X-Rite Asia Pacific Limited (Hong Kong)
 X-Rite Global, Inc.
 X-Rite GmbH (Germany)
 X-Rite Holdings, Inc.
 X-Rite International, Inc. (Barbados)
 X-Rite Ltd. (U.K.)
 X-Rite MA, Incorporated
 X-Rite Mediterranee SARL (France)
 XR Ventures LLC

References

External links
 

Electronics companies of the United States
Manufacturing companies based in Grand Rapids, Michigan
Companies formerly listed on the Nasdaq
Electronics companies established in 1958
1958 establishments in Michigan
1980s initial public offerings
2012 mergers and acquisitions
Danaher subsidiaries